El Sekka El Hadid Stadium, also known as Railway Stadium, is a multi-use stadium in Cairo, Egypt. It is currently used mostly for football matches and is the home of El Sekka El Hadid. The stadium holds 25,000 people.

References

Football venues in Egypt